Convergence is an annual North American social gathering of gay men of size (chubs) and their admirers (chasers). The event is considered the longest running social gathering of its kind in North America and serves a particular community, also known as the Chubs and Chasers community; a vibrant sub-culture of the gay community at large. Convergence is held during the USA Labor Day holiday weekend. The event has a history that goes back to 1986, when the first Convergence was held in Seattle, Washington. Since then, the event has been hosted annually in different cities across North America.

Location 

Convergence is a "floating" event; the location for each year is determined by the Big Gay Mens Organization (BGMO), formerly known as Affiliated Bigmen's Clubs (ABC), and originally associated with local Girth & Mirth chapters.

Past Convergences have been held in:

1986 Seattle Mayflower Park Hotel August 28 - September 1, 1986
1987 Washington D.C. at the Vista September 3-7, 1987
1988 New York City at the Mackelow September 1-5, 1988
1989 Los Angeles Hollywood Roosevelt Hotel August 31 - September 4, 1989
1990 Chicago at the Holiday Inn August 30 - September 3, 1990
1991 Boston at the Swissotel August 29 - September 2, 1991
1992 San Francisco Cathedral Hill Hotel September 3-7, 1992
1993 Washington D.C. Embassy Suites September 2-6, 1993
1994 New York City at the Millennium September 1-5, 1994
1995 Seattle at the Westin August 31 - September 4, 1995
1996 San Diego Radisson Hotel Circle
1997 Philadelphia at the Holiday Inn
1998 Reno at the Sands
1999 Denver at the Adam’s Mark Hotel
2000 Montreal at the Holiday Inn
2001 Dallas at the Sheraton
2002 Minneapolis at the Millennium
2003 Washington D.C. at the Grand Hyatt August 28 - September 1, 2003
2004 White Plains at the Crown Plaza
2005 New Orleans - Cancelled due to Hurricane Katrina
2006 Houston at the Marriott Medical Center
2007 Minneapolis at the Hyatt Nicollet Mall
2008 Washington D.C. at the Marriott Gateway August 28 - September 1,2008
2009 Las Vegas a.k.a. "BiggerVegas" at the Tuscany Suites and Casino
2010 Orlando at the Doubletree (formerly International Plaza)
2011 Boston at the CoCo Key Resort and Waterpark (North shore)
2012 Chicago at the Renaissance Chicago, Northbrook
2013 New Orleans at the InterContential
2014 Scottsdale at the DoubleTree Resort by Hilton Paradise Valley-Scottsdale
2015 Seattle at the DoubleTree Hilton Sea-Tac September 2–7, 2015 http://emeraldcityconvergence.com/#!/?page_id=13
2016 Orlando at the Wyndham Orlando Resort International Drive August 30 – September 5, 2016 http://www.orlandoconvergence.com/
2017 Las Vegas at the Luxor Hotel & Casino
2018 New York City at the Pennsylvania Hotel
2019 San Diego at the Marriott Mission Valley
2020 St. Louis at the Renaissance St. Louis Airport Hotel

See also
Chub (gay slang)

References

External links
 Big Gay Mens Organization (BGMO)
 New Orleans Convergence 2013
 Scottsdale Convergence 2014

Gay events
Bear (gay culture)
Fat fetishism
LGBT organizations in the United States